A salve is a medical ointment used to soothe the head or other body surface.

Salve may also refer to:

Places
 Salve, Apulia, a town in Italy
 Hohe Salve, a mountain

People
 Salve Andreas Salvesen (1909–1975), Norwegian politician
 Salve Hodne (1845-1916), Norwegian politician
 Gus Salve, baseball player
 Harish Salve (21st century), Indian lawyer
 Lahuji Raghoji Salve (1811–1881), Indian revolutionary
 N. K. P. Salve (1921 – 2012), Indian politician
 Salve H. Matheson (1920-2005), American military officer

Arts and entertainment
 Salve (film), a 2011 Iranian film
 "Salve", a song by Tommy Guerrero

Groups, companies, organizations
 Salve Kallevig & Søn, a Norwegian shipping company
 Salve (restaurant), a restaurant in Helsinki, Finland

Other uses
 Salve Regina, a Christian prayer

See also

 
 Salva (disambiguation)
 Salvo (disambiguation)